"He's on the Phone" is a song by British pop group Saint Etienne in collaboration with French singer-songwriter Étienne Daho, released in October 1995. A fast-paced dance track, it is one of Saint Etienne's biggest hits, reaching number 11 on the UK Singles Chart, number 31 in Iceland, number 41 in Sweden and number 33 on the US Billboard Dance Club Songs chart. The lyrics tell of an "academia girl" trying to escape from a relationship with a married man: "He's on the phone / And she wants to go home, / Shoes in hand, / Don't make a sound, / It's time to go." At the centre of the track is a spoken-word section by Daho.

The song is a remix by Motiv8 of "Accident", which appeared on the Saint Etienne/Étienne Daho Reserection EP, released a few months previously in June 1995. "Accident" itself is a rewritten version of Daho's 1984 French-language hit single "Weekend à Rome", with original English lyrics. Daho's spoken-word vocals are from the Reserection opening track, "Reserection".

The single was credited to "Saint Etienne featuring Étienne Daho". Daho also appears in the song's music video and joined the band in their performance of the song on Top of the Pops. Daho would also go on to perform the original "Weekend à Rome" lyrics with the instrumentation from "He's on the Phone" in a performance on the French edition of Star Academy. The single also had the honour of being Pete Tong's essential tune on Radio One.

Production
According to producer Steve Rodway, the band had never intended to use "Accident" as single material, but had given it to him for remixing as it was "the only new track they had" at the time of the release of Too Young to Die. Rodway retained an edited-down portion of Daho's vocals, and otherwise only kept the opening piano riff from the original instrumentation (both at the band's request).

Sound on Sound magazine describes "He's on the Phone" as characteristic of most of Rodway's "trademark" sounds:

A hard disk recorder was used to create backing vocals echoing the original through time stretching and pitch shifting.

Critical reception
Glenn Swan from AllMusic called the song "smart", adding that it "once again [are] showcasing the gorgeous voice of Sarah Cracknell and the plaintive Brit-pop songwriting skills of Bob Stanley, Pete Wiggs, and Ian Catt." Christopher Burns from Associated Press said it is "truly plastic, shameless Eurodisco with plenty of strings and horns. "The hotel life, forget your wife, you're on your own", they sing in "He's on the Phone". It's a contrast from the more experimental stuff Saint Etienne has done in the past." Larry Flick from Billboard described it as a "twirlin' U.K. club smash", that with "its deliciously sweet pop hook and adorable girl-group vocals" is "ripe for pop radio picking." He also added that Motiv 8 "kicks a snappy hi-NRG beat on its jiggly remix". James Masterton for Dotmusic complimented it as a "fantastic single", noting that "this is the first time they have ever release an out-and-out pop stomper." He concluded, "One of Britain's most unique bands is finally a major chart force." Swedish newspaper Expressen highlighted the "lovely" disco mix by the remixer. Tom Ewing of Freaky Trigger ranked "He's on the Phone" number 29 in his list of "Top 100 Singles of the 90s" in 1999. 

John Hamilton from Idolator remarked that the remixer had "painstaking rearranged Sarah’s vocals into a more melodic chorus and injected the track with what can only be described as a high dose of poppers: a galloping bass line, bright keyboards and a relentless nu-disco beat, with Daho’s spoken-word passage figuring powerfully in the breakdown." Ross Jones from The Guardian stated, "Saint Etienne's marriage to Europop is now official. He's On The Phone has it all – schlurping cymbals, swooping strings, pumping piano, forlorn chords, heartbroken lyrics, ramblings in a foreign tongue..." Taylor Parkes from Melody Maker named it Single of the Week. Brad Beatnik from Music Weeks RM Dance Update gave it four out of five, saying that Motiv 8 "have given the single a very upbeat Euro feel that's both sassy and trashy." Another editor, James Hamilton, viewed it as a "sweetly enunciated tuneful gentle ditty". Jim Wirth from NME called it "stunning", adding that the single, together with "Sylvie", are "a stellar amalgamation of handbag house and Bacharachian pop aesthetics." Rob Sheffield from Rolling Stone declared it as a "perfect" U.K. hit.

Chart performance
"He's on the Phone" was a notable hit in Europe, peaking at number nine in Scotland and number eleven in the UK. In the latter, it peaked in its first week at the UK Singles Chart, on 5 November 1995, becoming the group's most successful single there. Additionally, it entered the top 40 in Iceland (31), as well as the top 50 in Sweden (41) and on the Eurochart Hot 100, where it peaked at number 44. Outside Europe, it was very successful in Israel, peaking at number three in 1996. In the US, the song made it to a respectable number 33 on the Billboard Dance Club Songs chart.

Music video
A music video was produced to promote the single. It was later published on Saint Etienne's official YouTube channel in May 2012 and had generated more than 1.5 million views as of September 2022.

Track listings
All tracks were written and composed by Cracknell, Stanley, Wiggs, Daho; except where indicated.

 12-inch: Heavenly / HVN 50-12Pi (UK) "He's on the Phone" (Motiv 8 extended mix) — 6:25
 "He's on the Phone" (Motiv 8 dub)

 12-inch: Heavenly / HVN 50-12Pii (UK) "Cool Kids of Death" (Underworld mix) (Stanley, Wiggs) — 14:31
 "Like a Motorway" (David Holmes mix) (Stanley, Wiggs) — 13:01

 12-inch: Heavenly / HVN 50-12Piii (UK) "He's on the Phone" (Bungee Vocal Mix)
 "He's on the Phone" (Naked Bungee Dub)

 12-inch: MCA / MCA12-55268 (US) "He's on the Phone" (Motiv8 mix) — 6:26
 "He's on the Phone" (Primax Bungee dub mix) — 6:03
 "He's on the Phone" (Primax Bungee vocal mix) — 5:05

 CD: Heavenly / HVN 50CD (UK) "He's on the Phone" — 4:09
 "Groveley Road" (Stanley, Wiggs) — 3:39
 "Is It True" (Marc Bolan) — 2:49
 "The Process" (Stanley, Wiggs) — 3:11

 CD: Heavenly / HVN 50CDR (UK) "He's on the Phone" (Motiv8 mix) — 6:25
 "Cool Kids of Death" (Underworld remix) (Stanley, Wiggs) — 14:31
 "How I Learned to Love the Bomb" (Treacy) — 3:05

 CD: MCA / MCADM-55268 (US) "He's on the Phone" (radio edit) — 4:08
 "He's on the Phone" (Motiv8 mix) — 6:26
 "He's on the Phone" (Primax Bungee dub mix) — 6:03
 "He's on the Phone" (Primax Bungee vocal mix) — 5:05

 MC: Heavenly / HVN 50CS (UK)'
 "He's on the Phone" — 4:09
 "He's on the Phone" (Motiv8 mix) — 6:25

Charts

References

1995 singles
1995 songs
1996 singles
English house music songs
Heavenly Recordings singles
MCA Records singles
Macaronic songs
Saint Etienne (band) songs
Songs about telephones
Songs written by Bob Stanley (musician)
Songs written by Pete Wiggs
Songs written by Sarah Cracknell